Timothy William Ellis (born 26 August 1953) is a retired British bishop of the Church of England. From 2006 to 2013, he was Bishop of Grantham, a suffragan bishop in the Diocese of Lincoln; he was also an area bishop from 2010 until 31 January 2013.

Early life
Ellis was educated at City Grammar School, Sheffield; trained for the ministry at King's College London and at St Augustine's College, Canterbury; and took his Doctor of Philosophy (DPhil) at York University.

Ordained ministry
Ordained in 1977 he began his career with a curacy in Manchester at St John's Church, Old Trafford and was then successively Vicar at Pendleton; Vicar of St Leonard, Norwood, Sheffield; Rural Dean of Ecclesfield, also Canon of Sheffield Cathedral, and finally (before his ordination to the episcopate) Archdeacon of Stow and Lindsey in the Diocese of Lincoln.

A keen Sheffield Wednesday fan and occasional blogger, he is also believed to be the first bishop to sport an earring.

Ellis was the celebrant at the first U2charist in England and organised a national vigil before the first Gulf War. He is Chair of Sheffield Faiths Together and Chair of the community-led housing organisation, East Midlands Community Led Housing Trust. He continues to serve on the Fabric Advisory Council of  Sheffield Cathedral and is a member of the Advisory Panel on the Archaeology of Christian Burials in England's Standing Committee, having been Vice-Chair of the Council for the Care of Churches.

Ellis is now honorary assistant bishop in the Sheffield and Derby dioceses.

On 11 February 2017, Ellis was one of fourteen retired bishops to sign an open letter to the then-serving bishops of the Church of England. In an unprecedented move, they expressed their opposition to the House of Bishops' report to General Synod on sexuality, which recommended no change to the church's canons or practises around sexuality. By 13 February, a serving bishop (Alan Wilson, Bishop of Buckingham) and nine further retired bishops had added their signatures; on 15 February, the report was rejected by synod.

Styles
The Reverend Tim Ellis (1976–1998)
The Reverend Doctor Tim Ellis (1998–2000)
The Reverend Canon Doctor Tim Ellis (2000–2001)
The Venerable Doctor Tim Ellis (2001–2006)
The Right Reverend Doctor Tim Ellis (2006–present)

Publications and articles

References

1953 births
Alumni of the Theological Department of King's College London
Associates of King's College London
20th-century Church of England bishops
Living people
Bishops of Grantham
Archdeacons of Stow
English bloggers
People educated at The City School, Sheffield
British male bloggers